Rawatpur railway station is a small railway station in Kanpur district, Uttar Pradesh. Its code is RPO. It serves Rawatpur city. The station consists of one platform. The platform is not well sheltered. It lacks many facilities including water and sanitation. There has been proposal to halt Express trains at Rawatpur.

References

Railway stations in Kanpur Nagar district
Izzatnagar railway division